Triad Princess is a 2019 Taiwanese Netflix original series. It is Netflix's second original Mandarin series after Nowhere Man. Directed by Neal Wu, a bestselling author and the director of film At Cafe 6, it stars Eugenie Liu and Jasper Liu as the main cast.

Synopsis
Growing up in the shadow of her Triad father, Angie craves an independent life of her own. Defying her father's wishes, she takes on a gig as an undercover bodyguard for a famous actress at an agency, where she must navigate the unfamiliar world of glitz, glamour and even love.

Cast

Main 
 Eugenie Liu as Angie Ni, the daughter of Cosmos gang's boss
 Jasper Liu as Jasper Yi-hang Xu, a superstar in Asia
 Chang Zhang-xing as Lin Gui, an orphan who is a member of Cosmos gang
 Hung Yan-siang as Ding-ding, Angie's best friend

Special guest 
 Cecilia Choi Sze-wan as Ling Yun, a.k.a. Julia Lin, a celebrity and Yi-hang's fake girlfriend
 Tsao Yu-ning as Eddie Kim, the son of Golden Dragon's boss and Angie's fiancé

Recurring 
 Tien-hsin as Sophia Kwong, the manager of Yi-hang and Ling Yun
 Michael JQ Huang as Ni Kun, the boss of Cosmos gang
 Cheung Ka-nin as Kim Hong-tian, the boss of Golden Dragon
 HanGee Lui as Cai-tou (Radish), a member of Cosmos gang
 Amanda Liu as Nana, the assistant of Sophia
 Chen Ray-wei as Pineapple, a member of Cosmos gang
 Chang Shu-wei as Wang Jin-guo, Yun's ex-boyfriend

Guest 
 Lee Lee-zen as Chen Da-hui, Sophia's ex-husband
 Beatrice Fang as an actress who was Yi-hang's ex-girlfriend
 Toyoharu Kitamura as a miniseries director
 Tsai Ming-hsiu as Ah-ji (Lucky)
 Brando Huang as Li Jian-dong
 Hong Sheng-tei as the Police Chief
 Mickey Huang as Luo Zheng-fu

Episodes

Awards and nominations

References

External links
 
 

Mandarin-language Netflix original programming
2019 Taiwanese television series debuts
Taiwanese romance television series
Taiwanese drama television series
Triad (organized crime)